Consensus dynamics or agreement dynamics is an area of research lying at the intersection of systems theory and graph theory. A major topic of investigation is the agreement or consensus problem in multi-agent systems that concerns processes by which a collection of interacting agents achieve a common goal. Networks of agents that exchange information to reach consensus include: physiological systems, gene networks, large-scale energy systems and fleets of vehicles on land, in the air or in space. The agreement protocol or consensus protocol is an unforced dynamical system that is governed by the interconnection topology and the initial condition for each agent. Other problems are the rendezvous problem, synchronization, flocking, formation control. One solution paradigm is distributed constraint reasoning.

To investigate the argumentation of different subjects, a simulation is a useful tool. It can be measured, if an argument provides an additional truth value for a debate.

See also
 Consensus (computer science)

References

 Ghapani, S.; Mei, J.; Ren, W.; Song, Y. (2016), "Fully distributed flocking with a moving leader for lagrange networks with parametric uncertainties", Automatica, 67–76, doi:10.1016/j.automatica.2016.01.004
 

Multi-agent systems
Network theory
Control theory
Graph theory
Game theory
Distributed computing
Constraint programming